Liu Yunfeng (born August 3, 1979 in Suihua, Heilongjiang) is a male Chinese race walker.

In 2001 he received a two-year suspension for doping.

Achievements

See also
List of sportspeople sanctioned for doping offences

References

1979 births
Living people
Athletes (track and field) at the 2004 Summer Olympics
Chinese male racewalkers
Chinese sportspeople in doping cases
Doping cases in athletics
Olympic athletes of China
People from Suihua
Athletes from Heilongjiang
21st-century Chinese people